Anypotactus is a genus of broad-nosed weevils in the beetle family Curculionidae, subfamily Entiminae , tribe Anypotactini, present across Central and South America. There are six described species in Anypotactus.

Taxonomy 
Anypotactus was described for the first time by Carl Johan Schönherr in 1840 (p. 299). The type species is Anypotactus exilis Boheman, 1840: 300.

Description 
Members of Anypotactus are small (~4 to 10 mm). The following characters are provided by van Emden  to recognize Anypotactus:

Distribution 
Members of Anypotactus range from Guatemala to Bolivia without representatives in the Caribbean.

Species 
These six species belong to the genus Anypotactus :

 Anypotactus bicaudatus Champion, 1911: 215: Costa Rica, Panama.
 Anypotactus exilis Boheman, 1840: 300: Costa Rica, Guatemala, Honduras, Nicaragua, Panama, Colombia, Venezuela.
 Anypotactus gracilis Voss, 1932: 36 = Anypotactus curvipes Hustache, 1940: 272; = Anypotactus peruvianus Hustache, 1938: 265: Bolivia, Peru.
 Anypotactus morosus (Boheman), 1840: 449: Colombia,
 Anypotactus strangulatus Hustache, 1938: 266: Bolivia, Peru.
 Anypotactus sulcicollis Faust, 1892: 21: Venezuela.

References 

Entiminae